Henri Haest (2 November 1926 – 20 June 1997) was a Belgian athlete. He competed in the men's hammer throw at the 1952 Summer Olympics.

References

1926 births
1997 deaths
Athletes (track and field) at the 1952 Summer Olympics
Belgian male hammer throwers
Olympic athletes of Belgium
Place of birth missing
20th-century Belgian people
Sportspeople from Antwerp Province